Climatic changes may refer to:
 Global warming, climate change seen since the pre-industrial period
 Climate change (general concept), climate change throughout Earth's history